In chemistry, the Chinese lantern structure is a coordination complex where two metal atoms are bridged by four bidentate ligands. This structure type is also known as a paddlewheel complex. Examples include chromium(II) acetate, molybdenum(II) acetate, and rhodium(II) acetate, copper(II) acetate dihydrate. The name reflects a resemblance between the structure and a Chinese paper lantern.  Often these compounds bind additional ligands at the sites across from the M---M vector.  The degree of metal-metal bonding varies according to the d-electron configuration.

Further reading

References

Coordination chemistry